Tonto Charity Dikeh (born 9 June 1985) is a Nigerian actress, singer, songwriter, and humanitarian.  On 27 August 2000, Tonto Dikeh set up her foundation, the Tonto Dikeh Foundation.

In June 2022, Tonto was announced as the deputy governorship candidate under the African Democratic Congress in the 2023 Rivers State gubernatorial election. She was welcome by port Harcourt people after her declaration as deputy.

Movies and television 
Tonto Dikeh was featured in a movie titled Dirty Secret, which generated controversy among Nigerians due to its inclusion of adult scenes. While some people criticized her role for being nontraditional and un-African, others stated that Dikeh was merely being professional.

Music career 
Following a successful acting career, Tonto Dikeh decided to pursue a music career. Before that, she was featured in a music video for Amaco Investments, alongside Patience Ozokwor.
She made her music debut by releasing the singles "Hi" and "Itz Ova", the latter of which features Snypa. On 13 June 2014, Nigerian singer D'banj signed her to his record label, DB Records. Tonto Dikeh announced her departure from DB records in March 2015.

Personal life
Tonto Dikeh was born into a family of seven and is the third of five children. Her family is from Obio-Akpor, a LGA in Rivers State, and is of Ikwerre descent. At age 3, she lost her mother and was raised by her step-mother, who has two children. Dikeh studied petrochemical engineering at Rivers State University of Science and Technology. In September 2021, Tonto Dikeh's ex-fiancé, Prince Joseph Kpokpogri, sued her and the Department of State Security (DSS) to court for allegedly threatening his fundamental human rights. Kpokpogri said he left Tonto because of her hard smoking and bad 
drinking habit.

Controversy 
Her traditional marriage to Olakunle Churchill was held in August 2015. 
In 2014, she was rumored to have been in a sexual relationship with Rukky Sanda. However, during an interview with Rukky Sanda the rumour was debunked. 
In February 2016, Dikeh gave birth to her son, whom she nicknamed Baby X. However, since then, the couple has gone and moved different ways.

Dikeh had in early October 2021 entangled herself in a web of controversy after publishing in her social media handles, purported voice notes suggesting that her ex-lover, JOSEPH EGBRI (popularly known as Prince Kpokpogri) had sex tapes and nude photos on his smartphone of Usiwo Orezimena Jane, a Nigerian dancer, popularly known as JANEMENA. Dikeh was reported to have made the allegations in the wake of her messy breakup with her ex-lover, Kpokpogri, in September.

Endorsements
On 5 February 2016, Tonto Dikeh was named an Ambassador to a property firm in Abuja (NUMATVILLE) worth millions of Naira.

On 9 January 2018, Tonto Dikeh gets an endorsement as a brand ambassador for a beauty and skincare brand (Pels International). The beauty brand is popularly known for making skin brightening beauty products.

On 8 March 2018, Dikeh became an ambassador for Sapphire Scents, a new perfume line offering distributorship business opportunities to Nigerians.

On 27 April 2018, Tonto Dikeh bagged an endorsement deal with the National Agency For Prohibition of Trafficking In Persons (NAPTIP) on human trafficking.

On 24 March 2019, Tonto Dikeh  was revealed as the brand ambassador for Amstel Malta. This had happened when Tonto Dikeh stepped out in style for a dinner party organized by Amstel Malta. The dinner, organized specifically for brand influencers, saw Dikeh announced as one of its ambassadors.

On 23 May 2019, Tonto Dikeh signed a 100million Naira endorsement deal with Zikel Cosmetics.

Selected singles

Selected filmography

Tea or Coffee (2006) 
Pounds and Dollars (2006) 
Missing Rib (2007) 
Final Hour (2007) 
Divine Grace (2007) 
7 Graves (2007) 
Crisis in Paradise (2007)
Insecurity (2007) 
Away Match (2007) 
Games Fools Play (2007) 
The Plain Truth (2008) 
Love my Way (2008) 
Before the Fall (2008)
Total Love (2008) 
Strength to Strength (2008)
Missing Child (2009) 
Native Son (2009) 
Dangerous Beauty (2009)
My Fantasy (2010)
Zara
Dirty Secret (2010) 
Last Mission 
Blackberry Babes Re-loaded (2012) 
Secret Mission
Rush Hour 
Fatal Mistake 
Family Disgrace
Miss Maradonna
Mortal Desire 
Criminal Widow 1 
Criminal Widow 2 (2013)
Then Terror of a Widow 1 (2013)
Then Terror of a Widow 2 (2013)
Battle of the Queens (2014)
Throne of War (2014)

See also

 List of people from Port Harcourt

References

External links 

 

Actresses from Port Harcourt
Living people
Singers from Port Harcourt
1985 births
21st-century Nigerian actresses
21st-century Nigerian singers
Rivers State University alumni
Ikwerre people
Nigerian Christians
Actresses from Rivers State
Nigerian philanthropists
Nigerian politicians
Nigerian humanitarians
Nigerian songwriters
Nigerian actor-politicians
People from Rivers State
Nigerian singers